Diana Ordóñez (born 1987), known professionally as LeDania, is a Colombian multimedia artist based in Bogotá. Known mostly for her graffiti murals, LeDania also works in photography, graphic design, advertising, artistic makeup, and decorative items such as clothing and accessories.

Career 
LeDania is most known for her positive and vibrant graffiti murals, most of which locate in Chapinero, a neighborhood on the north side of Bogotá. Her graffiti often features animals and insects from Tasmania, in addition to other mythological, magical, or autobiographical symbols.

Other than graffiti, LeDania's figurative works derive from three different artistic movements: expressionism, cubism, and surrealism. The Museum of Contemporary Arts of Bogotá first exhibited LeDania's artwork in 2005. Her work was displayed in 2019 at the Street Lynx Bta, a gallery space representing dozens of Bogotá-based artists.

Select exhibits 

 2015 Art Biennial of Paraguay
 2016 Latino Graff
 2017 Arstcape
 2018 Gallery La Ley de Snell, Madrid, Spain.

Personal life 

LeDania's father is an artist and her mother an artisan. She graduated with a master's degree in plastic and visual arts from the Pontifical Xavierian University in 2010.

References 

1987 births
Living people
Street artists
21st-century Colombian women artists
21st-century American women artists
People from Bogotá